Tenali Junction railway station (station code:TEL) is an Indian Railways station in Tenali of Andhra Pradesh. It is administered under Vijayawada railway division of South Coast Railway zone (formerly South Central Railway zone).

History 

The – link was established in 1899. The Howrah–Chennai main line was constructed by Madras and Southern Mahratta Railway and was opened in January 1916.
The Vijayawada–Tenali section was electrified in 1979–80.

Classification 
In terms of earnings and outward passengers handled, Tenali is categorized as a Non-Suburban Grade-3 (NSG-3) railway station. Based on the re–categorization of Indian Railway stations for the period of 2017–18 and 2022–23, an NSG–3 category station earns between – crore and handles  passengers. The station serves about 10 lakh passengers, over 250 express and 170 freight trains every day.[4]
On 1 November 1899, the broad-gauge line was constructed between Vijayawada and Chennai, making rail journey between Chennai, Mumbai, Visakhapatnam, Howrah, New Delhi and Hyderabad possible. Tenali Junction is main station in the Tenali city and is one of the busiest railway stations in Andhra Pradesh. The city also has 4 local stations of Anglakuduru, Chinnaravur, Kolakaluru, Valiveru these are served as satellite stations of Tenali.

Structure and amenities 
The modernization of the station was taken by providing new escalators, lifts etc. SCR installed Automatic Ticket Vending Machines (ATVMs) in the station.

References

External links 

 

Railway stations in Guntur district
Railway stations in Vijayawada railway division
Railway stations in India opened in 1899
Railway junction stations in Andhra Pradesh
Transport in Tenali
Buildings and structures in Tenali